Gymnelia peculiaris is a moth of the subfamily Arctiinae. It was described by Rothschild in 1931. It is found in Bolivia.

References

Gymnelia
Moths described in 1931